Carlos Véliz (born 12 August 1987 in Holguín) is a male shot putter from Cuba. His personal best throw is 21.40 metres, achieved on 12 June 2011 in Brazzaville. However the mark had to be declared irregular because of the use of a light implement.

Career

 2006
Véliz's international career began with the World Junior Championships in Beijing, where he finished in a respectable 6th Place.

2007
Véliz competed at the Pan American Games in Rio de Janeiro, throwing 19.75m for the bronze medal.

2008
Véliz improved his personal best significantly on 13 May in Havana, with a throw of 20.72m. Also in Havana, he took the Central American and Caribbean Championships Shot Put title, with a throw of 20.10m. These throws ensured his qualification for the 2008 Beijing Olympic Games. In the Shot Put competition, he eventually finished 12th in Qualifying Group A with a throw of 19.58m, not enough to ensure his progression to the final.

2009
Again, Véliz qualified for a major championships, the World Championships in Berlin, but once again disappointed on the day, throwing 19.62m, over a metre behind his personal best, and just shy of a metre behind his season best throw of 20.40m

2010
Véliz added to his international medal tally with a bronze medal at the 14th Ibero-American Championships, with an effort of 20.20m. His season's best throw was 20.41m.

2011
Véliz made a significant improvement on his personal best, throwing 21.40m at Brazzaville, catapulting him into the World Top 10 .

Other Events
Véliz was a promising discus thrower as a junior (U20) athlete, and has a personal best throw with the 1.75 kg discus of 55.03m

Personal bests

Achievements

References

External links
 
 
 
 Tilastopaja biography
 Ecured biography (in Spanish)

1987 births
Living people
Cuban male shot putters
Athletes (track and field) at the 2007 Pan American Games
Athletes (track and field) at the 2008 Summer Olympics
Athletes (track and field) at the 2011 Pan American Games
Athletes (track and field) at the 2012 Summer Olympics
Olympic athletes of Cuba
Pan American Games silver medalists for Cuba
Pan American Games medalists in athletics (track and field)
Medalists at the 2007 Pan American Games
Medalists at the 2011 Pan American Games
People from Holguín Province
21st-century Cuban people